The Third Reich (El Tercer Reich in Spanish) is a novel by the Chilean author Roberto Bolaño written in 1989. It was discovered among his papers following his death and published in Spanish in 2010. An English translation by Natasha Wimmer was published in November 2011.

Plot

The novel concerns Udo Berger, a German wargame champion, who returns with his girlfriend Ingeborg to the small town on the Costa Brava where he spent the summers of his childhood. When one of his friends disappears Udo invites a mysterious local to play a game of Rise and Decline of the Third Reich, a classic wargame published by Avalon Hill.

Serialized publication

By special arrangement with the Bolaño estate, the Paris Review planned to publish the complete novel in four installments over the course of a year with illustrations by Leanne Shapton. The first installment appeared in the 2011 spring issue and the second in the 2011 summer issue. This is the first serialized novel published in the magazine since Harry Mathews’s The Sinking of the Odradek Stadium, forty years earlier.

Critical reception
The introduction to the first installment published in the Paris Review sees the novel as a precursor to Bolaño's later works:
From the first sentence, The Third Reich bears his hallmarks. The irony, the atmosphere of erotic anxiety, the dream logic shading into nightmare, the feckless, unreliable narrator: all prefigure his later work. The young novelist must have been exhilarated, and possibly alarmed, to discover his talent so fully formed.
Michael Schaub, reviewing the novel for NPR, stated that it was "compassionate, disturbing and deeply felt...in Udo Berger, Bolaño has created someone complex, sometimes frustrating and absolutely unforgettable." Giles Harvey meanwhile, writing for The New Yorker, found the novel to be "moody and uneven" and claimed it "should join that shelf marked 'For Completists Only,' on which also sit Antwerp, Monsieur Pain, The Romantic Dogs, Between Parentheses, and The Skating Rink."

References

External links
 

2010 Chilean novels

1989 Chilean novels

Works by Roberto Bolaño
Novels published posthumously
Editorial Anagrama books